Mul Illatha Roja is a 1982 Indian Tamil language film, directed by K. Ramraj, starring Chakravarthi and Vijayakala. The film was released on 15 October 1982.

Plot

Cast 
 Chakravarthi
 Vijayakala
 Goundamani

Soundtrack 
The soundtrack was composed by Muraliraj.

Reception 
Kalki wrote .

References

External links 
 

1980s Tamil-language films
1982 films